Napoleon is a city in Logan County, North Dakota, United States. It is the county seat of Logan County. The population was 749 at the 2020 census.

History
Napoleon was founded in 1886 and named for Napoleon Goodsill, a realtor from Steele who promoted the site. The Logan County Courthouse was built in 1921.

Geography

Napoleon is located at  (46.504657, -99.766979).

Demographics

2010 census
As of the census of 2010, there were 792 people, 337 households, and 203 families residing in the city. The racial makeup of the city was 98.4% White, 0.1% African American, 0.6% Native American, 0.3% from other races, and 0.6% from two or more races. Hispanic or Latino of any race were 1.0% of the population.

There were 337 households, of which 21.7% had children under the age of 18 living with them, 55.5% were married couples living together, 3.0% had a female householder with no husband present, 1.8% had a male householder with no wife present, and 39.8% were non-families. 37.7% of all households were made up of individuals, and 19% had someone living alone who was 65 years of age or older. The average household size was 2.23 and the average family size was 2.97.

The median age in the city was 48.9 years. 23.4% of residents were under the age of 18; 4.1% were between the ages of 18 and 24; 17.5% were from 25 to 44; 22.5% were from 45 to 64; and 32.3% were 65 years of age or older. The gender makeup of the city was 48.2% male and 51.8% female.

2000 census
As of the census of 2000, there were 857 people, 367 households and 238 families residing in the city. The population density was 616.8 per square mile (238.1/km). There were 420 housing units at an average density of 302.3 per square mile (116.7/km). The racial makeup of the city was 98.83% White, 0.35% Asian, 0.23% from other races, and 0.58% from two or more races. Hispanic or Latino of any race were 0.47% of the population.

There were 367 households, of which 22.3% had children under the age of 18 living with them, 58.0% were married couples living together, 4.9% had a female householder with no husband present, and 35.1% were non-families. 31.6% of all households were made up of individuals, and 19.3% had someone living alone who was 65 years of age or older. The average household size was 2.24 and the average family size was 2.82.

Age distribution was 22.1% under the age of 18, 3.7% from 18 to 24, 18.7% from 25 to 44, 22.3% from 45 to 64, and 33.3% who were 65 years of age or older. The median age was 50 years. For every 100 females, there were 90.9 males. For every 100 females age 18 and over, there were 85.6 males.

The median household income was $28,167, and the median family income was $36,042. Males had a median income of $28,036 versus $20,000 for females. The per capita income for the city was $16,208. About 5.9% of families and 8.8% of the population were below the poverty line, including 5.4% of those under age 18 and 15.3% of those age 65 or over.

Education
 Napoleon High School

Climate
This climatic region is typified by large seasonal temperature differences, with warm to hot (and often humid) summers and cold (sometimes severely cold) winters. According to the Köppen Climate Classification system, Napoleon has a humid continental climate, abbreviated "Dfb" on climate maps.

References

External links
 City of Napoleon official website

Cities in Logan County, North Dakota
Cities in North Dakota
County seats in North Dakota
Populated places established in 1886
1886 establishments in Dakota Territory